Glénac is a former commune in the Morbihan department of Brittany in north-western France. On 1 January 2017, it was merged into the commune La Gacilly. Its population was 889 in 2019. Inhabitants of Glénac are called in French Glénacois.

See also
Communes of the Morbihan department

References

External links

Former communes of Morbihan